The 2019 Leagues Cup was the inaugural edition of Leagues Cup, a club competition featuring four clubs from Major League Soccer and Liga MX in an eight-team single-elimination tournament hosted in the United States. It began on July 23, 2019, with the first set of quarterfinals, and culminated in a final match played in Las Vegas on September 18, 2019. Cruz Azul won the final, defeating UANL 2–1.

Qualification

The inaugural edition of the Leagues Cup featured eight teams—four invitees from Major League Soccer and four Liga MX clubs chosen based on competitive results. Future editions are planned to use league results to determine the participating teams from MLS.

Teams

The following 8 teams (from two associations) participated in the tournament.

Bracket

Quarterfinals

Semifinals

Final

Top goalscorers

References

2019
2019 in American soccer
2018–19 in Mexican football
2019–20 in Mexican football